The Broad Road is a 1923 American drama film written and directed by Edmund Mortimer. The film stars Richard Travers, May Allison, Ben Hendricks Jr., D.J. Flanagan, Mary Foy and Charles McDonald. The film was released on September 1, 1923, by Associated First National Pictures.

Cast       
Richard Travers as 'Ten Spot' Tifton 
May Allison as Mary Ellen Haley
Ben Hendricks Jr. as Bud Ashley
D.J. Flanagan as Jim Fanning
Mary Foy as Ma Fanning
Charles McDonald as Sheriff Bill Emmett
Emile La Croix as Old Fuzzy Lippert 
Roy Kelly as Kid Coppins
Alicia Collins as Mrs. Lippert

References

External links
 

1923 films
1920s English-language films
Silent American drama films
1923 drama films
First National Pictures films
Films directed by Edmund Mortimer
American silent feature films
American black-and-white films
1920s American films